Friends Forever (lit. "Friends for All Time") is a Danish film produced in 1986 and released at the beginning of 1987. It was directed by Stefan Henszelman to a script by himself and Alexander Kørschen, was shown to large audiences in New York City, Washington, D.C. and San Francisco and garnered the 1988 Audience Award at the San Francisco International Lesbian & Gay Film Festival.

The film was successfully shown at the 2005 Copenhagen Gay and Lesbian Film Festival by its Danish distributor, Nordisk.

Henszelman lived to direct one more film, Dagens Donna (1990). He died of AIDS on October 2, 1991, aged 31.

Plot
Teenager Kristian Malmquist moves to a new neighborhood and makes friends with two boys in his new school: Henrik, an independent loner, and Patrick, leader of a gang. Later on, Kristian is startled to find Patrick is having an affair with the captain of a soccer team and this leads him to explore his own feelings.

Cast
 Rita Angela as Rektor Kallenbach
 Carsten Morch as Dan Carstensen 
 Lars Kylmann Jacobsen as Anders
 Trine Torp Hansen as Berit
 Thomas Sigsgaard as Patrick
 Christine Skou as Sophie
 Claus Bender Mortensen as Kristian
 Morten Stig Christensen as Mads
 Mika Heilmann as Medlem af band
 Thomas Elholm as Henrik
Unnamed;
 Lilla Nielsen
 Rasmus Bay Barlby
 Christian Kamienski
 Claus Steenstrup Nielsen	
 Christian Adam Garnov

References
Det Danske Filminstitut/The Danish Film Institute  
IMDb: 
Murray, Raymond: Images in the Dark: An Encyclopedia of Gay and Lesbian Film and Video. N.Y., TLA Publications, 1994

External links 
 

1987 films
Danish coming-of-age drama films
1987 drama films
1987 LGBT-related films
1980s Danish-language films
Danish LGBT-related films
LGBT-related drama films
1980s coming-of-age drama films